Ethmia subnigritaenia is a moth in the family Depressariidae. It is found in Mexico.

The ground color of the forewings is whitish gray, infused with dark grayish clouding, slightly less so on the dorsal and terminal areas. The ground color of the hindwings is semitranslucent whitish, becoming pale brownish in the apical area.

References

Moths described in 1973
subnigritaenia